The Hawaii Army National Guard is a component of the United States Army and the United States National Guard. Nationwide, the Army National Guard comprises approximately one half of the US Army's available combat forces and approximately one third of its support organization.  National coordination of various state National Guard units are maintained through the National Guard Bureau.

Hawaii Army National Guard units are trained and equipped as part of the United States Army.

Units

Duties
National Guard units can be mobilized at any time by presidential order to supplement regular armed forces, and upon declaration of a state of emergency by the governor of the state in which they serve. Unlike Army Reserve members, National Guard members cannot be mobilized individually (except through voluntary transfers and Temporary DutY Assignments TDY), but only as part of their respective units. However, there has been a significant number of individual activations to support military operations (2001-?); the legality of this policy is a major issue within the National Guard.

Active Duty Callups

For much of the final decades of the twentieth century, National Guard personnel typically served "One weekend a month, two weeks a year", with a portion working for the Guard in a full-time capacity.  The current forces formation plans of the US Army call for the typical National Guard unit (or National Guardsman) to serve one year of active duty for every three years of service.  More specifically, current Department of Defense policy is that no Guardsman will be involuntarily activated for a total of more than 24 months (cumulative) in one six-year enlistment period (this policy is due to change 1 August 2007, the new policy states that soldiers will be given 24 months between deployments of no more than 24 months, individual states have differing policies).

History

Kingdom
The earliest forerunner of the Hawaii Army National Guard was the Honolulu Rifles a militia formed in 1854. In 1887 it was certified as a paramilitary.

Republic
On January 27, 1893, following the Overthrow of the Hawaiian Kingdom, the National Guard of Hawaii was formed largely adopting men from the Honolulu Rifles. The first action as a national guard was during the Leper War a pyyrhic victory.

Territory
On August 12, 1898 National Guard of Hawaii was converted into the Hawaii Territorial Guard. In 1938 members of the Guard unit in Hilo aided striking workers against government authorities during the protest that became known as the Hilo Massacre. The Territorial Guard was disbanded in 1942 and the Hawaii Army National Guard was formed. Many feel it was a conspiracy to purge the guard of Japanese Americans. Although hundreds of Japanese-Americans were forced to leave the Guard, 1,300 were retained.

Historic units
 
298th Infantry Regiment - The 298th Infantry was organized as the 1st Regiment, National Guard of Hawaii from 1893-95 at Honolulu. It was redesignated as the 1st Hawaiian Infantry Regiment and mobilized into federal service during World War I at Fort Shafter, Hawaii from 1918-19. In 1923 it was redesignated as the 298th Infantry Regiment. Called to Federal service on 15 October 1940, the 298th Infantry was assigned to the 25th Division on 1 October 1941. On 7 December 1941 the 298th Infantry came under fire and took casualties during the Japanese attack on Pearl Harbor. On 23 July 1942 the 298th Regiment was reassigned to the 24th Infantry Division. On 12 June 1943 the 298th Infantry was relieved from assignment to the 24th Division and was designated as a separate infantry regiment. It was assigned to the U.S. Army Central Pacific and participated in the Central and Western Pacific, Leyte and Ryukyu campaigns. The regiment was released from federal service on 10 April 1945 in Hawaii. On 8 January 1957 the 298th Infantry was reorganized and redesignated as the 298th Antiaircraft Artillery Group. It was further redesignated as the 298th Artillery Group (Air Defense) on 15 November 1961. On 22 January 1972 the 298th was reorganized and redesignated as the 298th Field Depot with station at Wahiawa, Hawaii. On 1 June 1976 the 298th Field Depot was inactivated with its headquarters and headquarters company being consolidated with headquarters and headquarters detachment, Hawaii Army National Guard. On 16 August 1997, a new 298th Regiment not related by lineage to the original 298th Infantry Regiment, was constituted as a Regional Training Institute for the Hawaii Army National Guard at Waimanalo, Hawaii.

  299th Infantry Regiment

References

External links

Bibliography of Hawaii Army National Guard History  compiled by the United States Army Center of Military History
Hawaii National Guard , accessed 20 Nov 2006
GlobalSecurity.org Hawaii Army National Guard, accessed 20 Nov 2006

United States Army National Guard by state
Military in Hawaii
1898 establishments in Hawaii